Nordendorf is a municipality  in the district of Augsburg in Bavaria in Germany.

Geography
Nordendorf, located on the federal highway 2 and the railway line Augsburg - Donauwörth, and Blankenburg, which is stretching southwest up the Schmutterleite, form the current community since 1975. Northwest of Nordendorf  is the monastery Holzen.

History
The name Nordendorf is of Franconian origin; evidence of an Alamanni forerunner settlement from around the middle of the 6th century came in 1844 when a row of 433 graves was uncovered on the occasion of the construction of the Augsburg-Donauwörth railway line, making the site one of the most important sites of the early Middle Ages in the Swabian-Bavarian region. The most important archaeological finds are the hanger brooches of Nordendorf, two clasps with runic inscriptions engraved on the back.

The current name is mentioned for the first time in 1213. Initially the lords of Donnsberg, Truchsesse of the Augsburg bishops, who had their castle on Donnsberg west of Nordendorf, were the lords of the manor. Around 1268 the Wittelsbachers destroyed Donnsberg Castle and Nordendorf came into their possession. In 1560 a new castle was built in the middle of the village, which burnt down in 1862. In 1580 a branch of the Fugger family had acquired the Nordendorf estate. This line lived here until 1878.

After the Second World War Nordendorf developed from an agricultural village to an attractive residential community with an interesting surrounding area between Schmutter and Lech and the local recreation area "Augsburg Western Forests".

The continuous increase in the number of inhabitants is ensured by the designation of building land at affordable prices. Today, agriculture is concentrated in the district of Blankenburg.

Nordendorf offers an excellent infrastructure as a small centre. The needs of daily life such as shopping facilities, provision of (dental) medical services, partial secondary school and kindergarten, with banks and handicraft businesses are optimally solved. The train connections every 30 minutes to Augsburg, Meitingen or Donauwörth make it easy to attend secondary schools and reach workplaces. The four-lane extension of the B2 between Augsburg and Donauwörth and the local ring road created excellent opportunities for the settlement of companies.

The local clubs offer a wide range of sporting and cultural activities.

Politics

Parish council

Distribution of seats in the 14-member council (as local elections 2008 ) :

 CSU : 5 seats
 SPD / Active Citizens : 5 seats
 CDU : 4 seats

Mayor
Tobias Kunz (Freie Wähler Nordendorf/Blankenburg) has been mayor of Nordendorf since 2020.

Coat of arms
The Heraldic description is: "Split of blue and silver, therein over a red ring a top-tinned bar in counterchanged colours."

Partner city
A partnership with the French commune Biesles (Haute-Marne) has existed since July 15, 1973.

See also
Nordendorf fibulae

References

Augsburg (district)